Tarasov, Tarasoff (masculine), or Tarasova (feminine) is a popular Russian surname that is derived from the male given name Taras and literally means Taras' or belonging to Taras. It may refer to:

People 

 Alexander Tarasov, Russian left-wing sociologist
 Alla Tarasova, Russian theater actress
 Anatoly Tarasov, ice hockey coach
 Boris Tarasov, Russian military officer
 Denis Tarasov, Russian Paralympic swimmer
 Dmitri Tarasov (footballer), Russian footballer
 Dmitri Tarasov (ice hockey), Russia ice hockey player
 Evgenia Tarasova, Russian figure skater
 Maksim Tarasov, pole vaulter
 Sergei Tarasov (biathlete), Russian biathlete
 Sofia Tarasova, Ukrainian singer
 Tatiana Tarasova, Russian figure skating coach
 Vladimir Tarasov, Russian director and animator

Places 

 Tarasov, Rostov Oblast, a village in Orlovsky District, Rostov Oblast, Russia
 Tarasov, Volgograd Oblast, a village in Ostrovskoye Rural Settlement, Danilovsky District, Volgograd Oblast, Russia
 Tarasova, a village in Solonceni Commune, Rezina district, Moldova

See also 

 Tarasoff v. Regents of the University of California (1976), a California Supreme Court decision
Viggo Tarasov, the primary antagonist of John Wick
Iosef Tarasov, the secondary antagonist of John Wick
Abram Tarasov, a minor antagonist in John Wick: Chapter 2

Russian-language surnames
Patronymic surnames
Surnames from given names